Penetopteryx nanus, also known as the worm pipefish, is a species of marine fish belonging to the family Syngnathidae. The species can be found in shallow water coral rubble and macroalgae habitats in the Western Atlantic from Providencia Island, Colombia, to the Bahamas and Belize. Reproduction occurs through ovoviviparity in which the males brood eggs before giving live birth. Penetopteryx nanus are typically 3-6 millimeters when born and can reach up to recorded lengths of 3.17 centimeters in adulthood. In their larval state, Penetopteryx nanus have well-developed fins, but these are lost in adulthood.

References

External links 
 Penetopteryx nanus at FishBase

Syngnathidae
Fish described in 1911